The Territorial Prelature of Mission de France (French: Prélature Territoriale de la Mission de France), also known as the Territorial Prelature of Pontigny (French: Prélature Territoriale de Pontigny) is a Latin Roman Catholic territorial prelature, located in the city of Pontigny in the Ecclesiastical province of the Metropolitan Archbishop of Dijon in Burgundy (France).

History 
 24 July 1941: The XXVI-th assembly of cardinals and the archbishoprics of France decided to found the Mission de France, opening a seminary in Lisieux, Calvados (Normandy). The purpose of the seminary was to train secular priests to carry out evangelical work in poor French dioceses.
 18 January 1954: Giuseppe cardinal Pizzardo, prefect of the Roman Curia's educational department (now Congregation for Catholic Education, then styled Congregation for Seminaries and Universities), notified the Lille diocese that the Mission de France seminary was to be closed and replaced by an "institute for missionary training" which would prepare priests to be sent to dechristianised regions.
 15 August 1954: Established as the Territorial Prelature of Mission de France, on territory split off from the Metropolitan Archdiocese of Sens.

Incumbent prelates 
(all Roman rite)
 Prelates of Mission de France 
 Cardinal Achille Liénart (1954 – November 1964)
 Archbishop François Marty (November 1964 – July 1968) (later Cardinal)*
 Bishop Henri Gufflet (15 July 1968 – 22 February 1973)
 Bishop André Gustave Bossuyt (3 April 1974 – 30 July 1974)
 Cardinal François Marty (6 May 1975 – 25 November 1975)
 Cardinal Roger Etchegaray (25 November 1975 – 23 April 1982)
 Cardinal Albert Decourtray (23 April 1982 – 1 October 1988)
 Bishop André Jean René Lacrampe, Ist. del Prado (1 October 1988 – 5 January 1995) (later Archbishop)*
 Archbishop Georges Edmond Robert Gilson (2 August 1996 – 31 December 2004)
 Archbishop Yves François Patenôtre (31 December 2004 – 5 March 2015)
 Archbishop Hervé Jean Robert Giraud (19 April 2015 – ...)

See also
Catholic Church in France

References

External links 
 GCatholic.org 
 Catholic Hierarchy 
 Prelature website (French)

Roman Catholic dioceses in France
Christian organizations established in 1954
Roman Catholic dioceses and prelatures established in the 20th century
Territorial prelatures
1954 establishments in France